Daniel Wyler Stroock (born March 20, 1940) is an American mathematician, a probabilist. He is regarded and revered as one of the fundamental contributors to Malliavin calculus with Shigeo Kusuoka and the theory of diffusion processes with S. R. Srinivasa Varadhan with an orientation towards the refinement and further development of Itô’s stochastic calculus.

Biography 
He received his undergraduate degree from Harvard University in 1962 and his doctorate from Rockefeller University in 1966.  He has taught at the Courant Institute of Mathematical Sciences and the University of Colorado, Boulder and is currently Simons Professor at the Massachusetts Institute of Technology.  He is known for his work with S. R. S. Varadhan on diffusion processes, for which he received the Leroy P. Steele Prize for Seminal Contribution to Research in 1996.

Stroock is a member of the U.S. National Academy of Sciences., In 2012 he became a fellow of the American Mathematical Society.

Quotes 

Mathematics is one, and possibly the only, human endeavor for which there is a widely, if not universally, recognized criterion with which to determine truth. For this reason, mathematicians can avoid some of the interminable disputes which plague other fields. On the other hand, I sometimes wonder whether the most interesting questions are not those for which such disputes are inevitable.

Selected publications 

with S. R. S. Varadhan: ; reprintings 1997, 2006

with Andrzej Korzeniowski: 
with Jean-Dominique Deuschel: ; reprinting 2001
; Birkhäuser, 2nd edition 1994;

References

External links 
 Home page for Daniel W. Stroock

Members of the United States National Academy of Sciences
Fellows of the American Mathematical Society
Probability theorists
20th-century American mathematicians
21st-century American mathematicians
Living people
University of Colorado faculty
Massachusetts Institute of Technology School of Science faculty
Harvard University alumni
1940 births
Courant Institute of Mathematical Sciences faculty